Pandacan being established as a community in 1574 is considered as one of the oldest districts in Manila and contains several notable places rich in heritage. It is home to a few well-known historical figures, historical landmarks and hosts a number of ancestral houses.

Location 
Notable residential structures built from the 1960s or earlier can be found along the streets leading to the Sto. Nino de Pandacan Parish Church, namely Teodora San Luis street, Labores street, Industria street and Narciso street.

Ancestral Houses

Romualdez Mansion

Located at the Jesus Corner San Luis, the Romualdez Mansion is an ancestral house belonging to Daniel Romualdez who also served as the Cabeza de Barangay during his time. He is the paternal grandfather of politician Daniel Romualdez and a distant relative of Imelda Marcos.

The Romualdez Mansion is a pre-war residential building with a flat facade which borrows some features from the secessionist architecture characterized by ornate metal grills and floral engravings. Another distinctive feature is the intricately designed patterns punctured on the eaves supported by triangular support which was also applied to its voladas.

Thelmo House
Currently owned by the Thelmo family, the house is believed to be the former residence of Justice Natividad Almeda-Lopez, the first female lawyer in the Philippines. In popular culture, the house continues to be a popular filming sites for local television series and movies.

The Thelmo House is Pandacan’s favored house of shoot. And this is easy to understand. Built before World War II on an 800 sq m lot, it is the street’s sole property with high concrete fence and a garden in front a brick and concrete two-storey Venetian-style villa. An arched front door in floral motif opens to a massive balayong staircase. The backside is made of bricks to check soil erosion from the estero beside the property. Although it has undergone minor maintenance jobs such as repainting of the exterior that somehow removed traces of its age, the Thelmo House has seen better times. The garage at the far end had been converted into a carinderia that operates irregularly.

A television or film crew’s partiality for the Thelmo House is plausible. They get the favored status from its barangay: Teodora San Luis St. is closed for traffic and can be used for parking lot for the gen sets and cast and crew vehicles, provide security services, and even an unobtrusive neighborhood ready to act as extras if required. But nobody knows until when shoots can be held at the Thelmo House or, for that matter, if it will continue to exist, as it has been up for sale for P25M for the longest time. The security assurance here is to declare it as a heritage house that it duly deserves.

Prominent Historical Figures from Pandacan 
Pandacan was home to prominent Filipino artists of the 19th century and these people are commemorated with historical markers along the streets of Pandacan District.

Ladislao Bonus 

Ladislao Bonus was a composer, conductor, contrabass player, and teacher. His pioneering work on musical drama earned him the title as the "Father of the Filipino opera. He was born and raised in Pandacan. As tribute to his greatest contribution to the Philippine Opera, a historical marker inscribed in 1980 was erected along San Luis Street.

Fr. Jacinto Zamora 
Jacinto Zamora is widely-known as one of the Gomburza trio who were summarily executed by the Spanish colonial officials because of their influence to the Secularization movement. Zamora, along with Jose Burgos and Mariano Gomez, became the inspiration to Jose Rizal's subversive novel, El Filibusterismo which  

depicts the abuse of Spanish government. Zamora began his early education in Pandacan, Manila and later graduated with the degree of Bachelor of Canon and Civil Laws. He then continued his training for priesthood in the Seminary of Manila. Because of his role on advocating the rights of the Filipino priests, a monument is erected in his honor at a place known as Plaza Zamora along San Luis Street where his house had once stood.

Francisco Balagtas 
Francisco Balagtas also known as Francisco Baltazar, was a prominent Filipino poet, and is widely considered as one of the greatest Filipino literary laureate for his impact on Filipino literature. He is originally from Bigaa, Bulacan but moved to Pandacan in 1835 where he met María Asunción Rivera, who would effectively serve as the muse for his future works. His famous epic, Florante at Laura, is regarded as his defining work. She is referenced in Florante at Laura as 'Celia' and 'MAR'. Because of his greatest contribution to the Philippine literature, a plaza and park Pandacan known as Plaza Balagtas was constructed in his honor.

Image gallery

See also 
 Tourism in Manila

References

External links 
 City of Manila 

Pandacan
Tourist attractions in Manila